Harold H. "Hal" Haenel (born October 18, 1958 in St. Louis, Missouri) is an American sailor and Olympic Champion. He competed at the 1992 Summer Olympics in Barcelona and won a gold medal in the Star class with Mark Reynolds. He received a silver medal at the 1988 Summer Olympics in Seoul.

References

External links
 
 
 

1958 births
Living people
American male sailors (sport)
Sailors at the 1988 Summer Olympics – Star
Sailors at the 1992 Summer Olympics – Star
Sailors at the 1996 Summer Olympics – Star
Olympic gold medalists for the United States in sailing
Olympic silver medalists for the United States in sailing
Medalists at the 1992 Summer Olympics
Medalists at the 1988 Summer Olympics
Star class world champions
World champions in sailing for the United States